This list is of the Natural Monuments of Japan within the Prefecture of Tottori.

National Natural Monuments
As of 1 April 2021, twenty Natural Monuments have been designated, including two *Special Natural Monuments; the Southern Native Limit of the Japanese rose includes an area of Ibaraki Prefecture.

Prefectural Natural Monuments
As of 1 May 2020, fifty-six Natural Monuments have been designated at a prefectural level.

Municipal Natural Monuments
As of 1 May 2020, eighty-nine Natural Monuments have been designated at a municipal level.

See also
 Cultural Properties of Japan
 Parks and gardens in Tottori Prefecture
 List of Places of Scenic Beauty of Japan (Tottori)
 List of Historic Sites of Japan (Tottori)

References

External links
  Cultural Properties in Tottori Prefecture

 Tottori
Tottori Prefecture